My Son Is Gay, also known as En Magan Magizhvan in India, is a 2017 Indian Tamil-language film.  It is a  tale of a gay man coming out and the impact it has on his relationship with his mother and other people around them. Lokesh Kumar, a filmmaker from Chennai, India, wrote and directed the film. The film is about acceptance, tolerance, and the right of marginalized people to live with dignity in mainstream of society. The film has won 4 awards.

Plot 
Lakshmi is a mother and a no-nonsense school principal.  Her life is uncomplicated and safe and she is blissfully unaware of the storm brewing that will threaten everything she believes in. She loves her son Varun, a cheerful and a carefree young man who is devoted to her.  Varun always knew he was different from other boys, but felt secure in his mother's love.  That security is shattered when Lakshmi discovers Varun is gay and rejects him. Varun finds love with Karthik, but he will never be as happy as he once was. Lakshmi can't bear the loss of her son and sets out to find him.

Cast 

 Anupama Kumar as Lakshmi
 Ashwinjith as Varun
 Abishek Joseph George as Karthik
 Jayaprakash as Dr Ram
 Kishore as Gopi
 Sriranjini as Uma
 Eswari as Chandrama
 Sharath as Rohit
 Maya S. Krishnan as Maya
 Sharukh Ahmed as Sharukh
 Sowmith Yadav as Aakash

Production 
The project began as a Hindi-language feature film in 2013. The makers made an unsuccessful attempt at crowd-funding and put the film on hold for almost two years. By 2016 the director Lokesh Kumar and Anil Saxena (producer) decided to produce it in Tamil. The movie was shot at Malabar Cove (near the famous Drive-in Beach of Muzhappilangad) in Kannur, Kerala, South India. The film was completed by early 2017 and saw its world premiere at the Indian Film Festival of Melbourne. It was selected to be shown at the New York LGBT Film Festival in October 2017. The film was also selected in Dialogues Kolkata LGBT fest and had its Indian Premiere there. The film had its Chennai Premiere in 15th Chennai International Film Festival by December 2017. The film had great response in Kolkata and Chennai.

In 2018, the rights of the film was acquired by a Mumbai based company called Select Media & the film was dubbed in Hindi language, which was further sold to Star India for their television streaming. The Hindi dubbed version was released on 4 October 2020 and the original Tamil version was released on 4 November 2020 in Youtube.

References

External links
 http://www.mysonisgaythemovie.com/
 

Indian independent films
Indian LGBT-related films
2010s Tamil-language films
2017 LGBT-related films